Baryplegma rusticum is a species of tephritid or fruit flies in the genus Baryplegma of the family Tephritidae.

Distribution
Ecuador.

References

Tephritinae
Insects described in 1934
Diptera of North America